Victoria College ( Vikrōṟiyāk Kallūri) is a provincial school in Chulipuram, Sri Lanka.

See also
 List of schools in Northern Province, Sri Lanka

References

External links
 Victoria College
 Old Students' Association, Canada
 Old Students' Association, UK

1876 establishments in Ceylon
Educational institutions established in 1876
Provincial schools in Sri Lanka
Schools in Jaffna District